"Get a Move On" is a song by American rock singer Eddie Money from his album Playing for Keeps in 1980. It was released as a single and reached #46 on the Billboard Hot 100.

Chart performance
The song peaked at No. 46 on the Billboard Hot 100 in the US and No. 59 on the RPM 100 single chart in Canada.

In popular culture
The song was released for the soundtrack  film Americathon (1979), and was later used in an episode of CSI: New York in 2011 and the film Godzilla (1998) and In A World... (2013).

1979 singles
Eddie Money songs
1979 songs
Columbia Records singles
Songs written by Eddie Money